The 2008–09 Idaho Vandals men's basketball team represented the University of Idaho during the 2008–09 NCAA Division I men's basketball season. Members of the Western Athletic Conference (WAC), the Vandals were led by first-year head coach Don Verlin and played their home games on campus at Cowan Spectrum in Moscow, Idaho.

They met sixth-seed Louisiana Tech in the quarterfinals of the conference tournament in Reno and lost by eight points. Invited to the inaugural edition of the 16-team CollegeInsider.com Tournament (CIT), Idaho advanced to the quarterfinals.

Verlin was hired in March; he was previously an assistant at Utah State under Stew Morrill.

Postseason result

|-
!colspan=5 style=| WAC Tournament

|-
!colspan=5 style=| CollegeInsider.com Tournament

References

External links
Sports Reference – Idaho Vandals: 2008–09 basketball season
Idaho Argonaut – student newspaper – 2009 editions

Idaho Vandals men's basketball seasons
Idaho
Idaho Vandals men's basketball team
Idaho Vandals men's basketball team